Hurricane Fred was one of the easternmost forming major hurricanes in the North Atlantic basin since satellite observations became available. Forming out of a strong tropical wave on September 7, 2009 near the Cape Verde Islands, Fred gradually organized within an area of moderate wind shear. The following day, decreasing shear allowed the storm to intensify and develop well-organized convective banding features. Shortly after reaching this intensity, the hurricane began to weaken as wind shear increased and dry air hampered convective development.

Throughout September 10, Fred maintained Category 2 status before weakening to a Category 1 hurricane. Continued weakening took place on September 11 as convection became fully disorganized. Later that day, Fred weakened to a tropical storm and by September 12, no convection remained around the center of the former hurricane, leaving an exposed low-level circulation. The storm degenerated into a remnant-low later that day, corresponding with the final advisory from the National Hurricane Center (NHC). The remnants of Fred persisted for nearly a full week, traveling west-northwest across the Atlantic basin. The remnants finally dissipated on September 19. Prior to becoming a tropical depression, the precursor to Fred produced moderate to heavy rainfall in the southern Cape Verde Islands, leading to two flight cancellations and several delays.

Meteorological history

Hurricane Fred originated from a strong tropical wave that moved off the west coast of Africa on September 6. Environmental conditions ahead of the system favored development and the system was forecast to slowly develop into a tropical cyclone. The following day, the wave tracked south of the Cape Verde Islands; however, it was close enough to bring showers and gusty winds to the southern islands. By this time, the National Hurricane Center anticipated the system to organize into a tropical depression within 24 hours. While passing near Cape Verde, a broad area of low pressure developed within the tropical wave. Following further development, the NHC declared that the low strengthened into a tropical depression, the seventh of the 2009 season, and issued their first advisory on it.

Upon being classified a tropical depression, the NHC noted that the center of circulation was difficult to locate and the mid-level circulation was displaced from the low-level circulation. The cyclone tracked slightly north of due west in response to a small ridge to the north. Moderate wind shear initially displaced convective activity to the west. Several hours after being classified, the NHC upgraded the depression to Tropical Storm Fred; this was the first use of the name Fred in the Atlantic basin after it replaced Fabian which was retired in 2003. This followed the development of convective banding features along the periphery of the storm and strong shower and thunderstorm activity forming over the center of Fred. The system continued to organize, with the banding features becoming well-defined within hours and strong outflow developing around the storm.

By the afternoon of September 8, an eye began to develop within a central dense overcast. By the morning of September 9, satellite imagery depicted that Fred had undergone rapid intensification and attained Category 2 status. This resulted from the formation of a -wide eye due to low wind shear and high sea surface temperatures.

Hours after attaining its peak intensity, Fred began to weaken as clouds began to fill the eye. By this time, the hurricane was beginning to turn toward the northwest as a subtropical ridge to the north weakened. Continued weakening took place as dry air started to erode convection along the southern edge of the system and the eye was no longer present on satellite imagery and wind shear also increased. Convection gradually became elongated in response to the shear and outflow was mostly restricted to the northeast region of the hurricane. By September 10, the mid-level circulation center was displaced from the low-level circulation center. On September 11, the convective pattern of Fred had no organized shape to it and the NHC downgraded the hurricane to a tropical storm. Unrelenting shear and dry air finally took their toll on September 12. By that time, no deep convection was associated with the main circulation of Fred, leaving the center fully exposed. The storm degenerated into a remnant-low later that day, corresponding with the final advisory from the National Hurricane Center.

On September 13, despite being in an extremely hostile environment with very high wind shear, convection redeveloped near the center of Fred, and regeneration into a tropical cyclone was seen as a possibility. Two days later, the NHC noted that environmental conditions could become marginally favorable for redevelopment of the system. On September 16, the circulation of Fred became less defined and only intermittent convection persisted around the system. By September 17, the remnant circulation became increasingly disorganized and the system dissipated later that day without regenerating into a tropical cyclone.

Remnant moisture from Hurricane Fred contributed to the 2009 Southeastern United States floods, which caused 10 fatalities and produced damages estimated at $250 million.

Historical perspective and impact
Over the years that the Atlantic hurricane basin has been thoroughly studied since 1851, there was only one other storm prior to Hurricane Fred to attain Category 3 intensity south of 30°N and east of 35°W. This storm was Hurricane Frances in 1980. In one of the NHC's discussions on Hurricane Fred, it was mentioned that due to the unusual location of a storm of its intensity, the hurricane would likely have gone unnoticed before the advent of satellite imagery in the 1960s.

Several hours before being declared a tropical depression, the precursor to Fred produced moderate rainfall and gusty winds across the southern Cape Verde Islands. In the city of Praia, Cape Verde, only a trace of rain, less than  fell on September 7 and sustained winds reached . The increased winds and heavy rains led to the cancellation of two flights and the delay of several others.

See also

Timeline of the 2009 Atlantic hurricane season
Hurricane Frances (1980)
Hurricane Julia (2010)
Hurricane Fred (2015) – became the easternmost Atlantic hurricane before moving through Cape Verde

References

External links
The National Hurricane Center's Advisory Archive for Hurricane Fred

2009 Atlantic hurricane season
Category 3 Atlantic hurricanes
Cape Verde hurricanes
Hurricanes in Cape Verde
Tropical cyclones in 2009